The National Congress of State Games is an American nonprofit sports association, consisting of 29 full members and five developing members. NCSG members run 28 Summer Games and 10 Winter Games. The NCSG is part of the United States Olympic Committee and organizes the State Games of America, an Olympic-style multi-sport event in which athletes who have won a medal in their home state's Games are eligible to compete.

Member States
 Alabama Sports Festival (Alabama)
 Grand Canyon State Games (Arizona) 
 California State Games (California)
 Rocky Mountain State Games (Colorado)
 Nutmeg State Games (Connecticut)
 Sunshine State Games (Florida)
 Georgia Games (Georgia)
 Iowa Games (Iowa)
 Sunflower State Games (Kansas)
 Bluegrass State Games (Kentucky)
 Louisiana State Games (Louisiana)
 Bay State Games (Massachusetts)
 State Games of Michigan (Michigan)
 Star of the North Games (Minnesota)
 State Games of Mississippi (Mississippi)
 Show-Me State Games (Missouri)
 Big Sky State Games (Montana)
 Cornhusker State Games (Nebraska)
 Garden State Games (New Jersey)
 New Mexico Games (New Mexico)
 Empire State Winter Games (New York)
 State Games of North Carolina (North Carolina)
 State Games of Oklahoma (Oklahoma)
 State Games of Oregon (Oregon)
 Keystone State Games (Pennsylvania)
 Games of Texas (Texas)
 Utah Summer Games, Utah Winter Games (Utah)
 Commonwealth Games of Virginia (Virginia)
 Badger State Games (Wisconsin)

State Games with Developing Membership in the NCSG 
 Name TBA (Illinois)
 Ohio Games (Ohio)
 State Games South Carolina (South Carolina)
 Name TBA (Tennessee)
 Cowboy State Games (Wyoming)

Former
 Prairie Rose State Games (North Dakota) (ran from 1987 to 2011)

References

External links
Official Site

Multi-sport events in the United States
Sports governing bodies in the United States
Non-profit organizations based in the United States